HLA-DR10 (DR10) is a HLA-DR serotype that recognizes the DRB1*1001 gene product.

Serology

The serological reaction of DR10 is relatively good.

Disease associations

By serotype
DR10 serotype or cognate alleles are associated with: Lichen planus

By allele
DRB1*1001 is associated with  ovarian cancer and invasive squamous cell cervical cancer (SCC)

Extended linkage
DRB1*1001:DQA1*01:DQB1*05 haplotype: Rheumatoid arthritis The primary involvement appears to be DR10.

Genetic Linkage

HLA-DR10 is not genetically linked to DR51, DR52 or DR53, but is linked to HLA-DQ1 and DQ5 serotypes. One haplotype found in caucasians is the HLA-A1-B37-Cw6-DR10-DQ5.

References

1